WIRO (107.1 FM) is a station covering the Huntington, West Virginia area. The Educational Media Foundation outlet broadcasts at 107.1 MHz with an ERP of 3.1 kW, is licensed to Ironton, Ohio and is currently branded as an Air1 affiliate playing contemporary worship music.

History
WIRO, which originally signed on the air in 1973 as WITO, would later go through format and call sign changes as WMLV (1985–97) and WFXN (1997–2002) before Clear Channel Communications transformed them into a local version of the KISS-FM brand under the WBKS call sign. But unlike the traditional mainstream top 40 format that was used at their sister stations, this version focused on rhythmic hits and did not use the trademarked blue ball. The reason for this was due to having a sister station in WKEE, which is the market's top 40 outlet.

On or before December 31, 2009, WBKS underwent a format change, becoming a simulcast of active rock station WAMX. On January 19, the station changed its call sign from WBKS to WLRX.

On October 30, 2012, the station underwent another format change, joining 24/7 Comedy.

On June 2, 2014, WLRX flipped to classic country as 107.1 The Bear.

On March 3, 2019, iHeartMedia announced it would sell four stations in its Aloha Station Trust, including WLRX, to the Educational Media Foundation in exchange for six translators already operated by iHeartMedia. The station was expected to flip to one of EMF's national networks (K-Love, Air1, or K-Love Classics) upon the sale's closure.

On May 31, 2019, the sale to Educational Media Foundation was closed and WLRX began operating under the Air1 branding. The station changed its call sign to WAWT.

The station changed its call sign to WIRO on November 9, 2022.

Former logo

References

External links

Ironton, Ohio
Radio stations established in 1973
1973 establishments in Ohio
Air1 radio stations
Educational Media Foundation radio stations
IRO